In human anatomy, the cephalic vein is a superficial vein in the arm. It originates from the radial end of the dorsal venous network of hand, and ascends along the radial (lateral) side of the arm before emptying into the axillary vein. At the elbow, it communicates with the basilic vein via the median cubital vein.

Anatomy 
The cephalic vein is situated within the superficial fascia along the anterolateral surface of the biceps.

Origin 
The cephalic vein forms over the anatomical snuffbox at the radial end of the dorsal venous network of hand.

Course and relations 
From its origin, it ascends up the lateral aspect of the radius.

Near the shoulder, the cephalic vein passes between the deltoid and pectoralis major muscles (deltopectoral groove) through the clavipectoral triangle, where it empties into the axillary vein.

Anastomoses 
It communicates with the basilic vein via the median cubital vein at the elbow.

Clinical significance 
The cephalic vein is often visible through the skin, and its location in the deltopectoral groove is fairly consistent, making this site a good candidate for venous access. Permanent pacemaker leads are often placed in the cephalic vein in the deltopectoral groove. The vein may be used for intravenous access, as large bore cannula may be easily placed. However, the cannulation of a vein as close to the radial nerve as the cephalic vein can sometimes lead to nerve damage.

History
Ordinarily the term cephalic refers to anatomy of the head. When the Persian Muslim physician Ibn Sīnā's Canon was translated into medieval Latin, cephalic was mistakenly chosen to render the Arabic term al-kífal, meaning "outer".

Additional images

See also 
 Basilic vein
 Median cubital vein

References

External links
 
 

Anatomy
Veins of the upper limb
Human surface anatomy
Cardiovascular system
Circulatory system